Ola Rask (born 1940), is a Swedish social democratic politician who has been a member of the Riksdag since 1994.

References

External links
Ola Rask (S)

1940 births
Living people
Members of the Riksdag from the Social Democrats
Place of birth missing (living people)
Members of the Riksdag 2002–2006
Members of the Riksdag 1994–1998
Members of the Riksdag 1998–2002
20th-century Swedish politicians
21st-century Swedish politicians